Notre Dame High School is a private, Roman Catholic high school in Portsmouth, Ohio, United States. It is a part of the Roman Catholic Diocese of Columbus.

Academics & activities 

Mock Trial
National Honor Society
Ohio Model United Nations
Pep Club
Quiz Bowl
Spanish Club
Student Council
Yearbook
Key Club

Athletics
There are ten school districts and eleven high schools in Scioto County along with one parochial school as well several private and community schools.  The school's athletic affiliation is with the Ohio High School Athletic Association (OHSAA) and the Southern Ohio Conference (SOC), which has seventeen member schools and is divided into two divisions (SOC I & SOC II) based on the schools' enrollment. Notre Dame is currently in SOC I.

Notre Dame participates in baseball, boys' and girls' basketball, boys' and girls' cross country, football, boys' golf, fast-pitch softball, boys' and girls' swimming, boys' and girls' tennis, boys' and girls' track & field, and girls' volleyball.

See also Ohio High School Athletic Conferences and the Southern Ohio Conference.

Notable alumni, coaches, and faculty
Chuck Ealey — football star
Ed Miller — former football coach & member of Ohio High School Football Coaches Association Hall of Fame
John Ross — former football player. Graduated in 1971. Member of University of Toledo Football Hall of Fame (inducted Feb. 1, 2008). One of the first great wide receivers in University of Toledo football history.
Mike Ross -- former football player. Graduated in 1973. Retired U.S. Air Force Lt. Colonel and fighter pilot, who ejected from his burning aircraft and survived after his RF-4C was mistakenly shot down by a U.S. Navy F-14 warplane over the Mediterranean Sea in 1987.

References

External links
 

Roman Catholic Diocese of Columbus
High schools in Scioto County, Ohio
Catholic secondary schools in Ohio
Private middle schools in Ohio
Portsmouth, Ohio
Educational institutions established in 1852
1852 establishments in Ohio